Manuel Ordovás González (9 December 1912 – 16 April 1999) was a Spanish equestrian. He competed in two events at the 1952 Summer Olympics.

Notes

References

External links
 
 

1912 births
1999 deaths
Spanish male equestrians
Olympic equestrians of Spain
Equestrians at the 1952 Summer Olympics
Place of birth missing